Lawrence Run is a  long 1st order tributary to North Fork Kings Creek in Beaver County, Pennsylvania.

Course
Lawrence Run rises about 0.25 miles south of Kendall, Pennsylvania, and then flows southwest to join North Fork Kings Creek about 5 miles west-northwest of Frankfort Springs.

Watershed
Lawrence Run drains  of area, receives about 38.9 in/year of precipitation, has a wetness index of 334.21, and is about 80% forested.

See also
List of rivers of Pennsylvania

Maps

References

Rivers of Pennsylvania
Rivers of Beaver County, Pennsylvania